Spelman may refer to:

People with the surname
Caroline Spelman, British politician
David Spelman (born 1966), American music producer
Edward Spelman (died 1767), English translator 
Elizabeth V. Spelman, American philosopher
Henry Spelman, British antiquarian
Henry Spelman of Jamestown (1595–1623), English adventurer, soldier, and author
 Sir John Spelman (historian) (1594–1643), English historian and politician, MP for Worcester
 Sir John Spelman (judge) (died 1546), English judge
 John Spelman (MP for Castle Rising) (1606–1663), English politician 
Laura Spelman Rockefeller (1839–1915), American philanthropist
Mick Spelman, English footballer
Taffy Spelman (1914–?), English footballer
Timothy Mather Spelman (1891–1970), American composer

Other uses
Spelman (music), performer of Swedish folk music
Spelman College, in Atlanta, Georgia, U.S.

See also
 Spellman, a surname
 Spielmann, a surname
 Spilman (disambiguation)
 Szpilman, a surname